Golgotha is the debut studio album by American deathcore band With Blood Comes Cleansing. It was released in 2006 on Blood and Ink Records.  Vocalist Mike Sasser left shortly after the recording of this album, and original vocalist Dean Atkinson returned.

Track listing
"An Introduction to Death" - 0:39
"Golgotha" - 2:31
"Mark Your Words" - 2:39
"Fearless Before Opposition" - 2:52
"Take Everything" - 3:40
"My Help" - 2:30
"Persecution" - 2:58
"Bring Out Your Dead" - 2:35
"Betrayed" - 2:25
"Hypocrisy" - 2:16

Personnel
Michael Sasser - vocals
Scott Erickson - guitar
Jeremy Sims - guitar
Greg Titus - bass
Spence Erickson - drums

References

2006 debut albums
With Blood Comes Cleansing albums